New Laguna is an unincorporated community in Cibola County, New Mexico, United States. New Laguna has a post office with ZIP code 87038.

References

Unincorporated communities in Cibola County, New Mexico
Unincorporated communities in New Mexico